The lunar north pole is the point in the Northern Hemisphere of the Moon where the lunar axis of rotation meets its surface.

The lunar North Pole is the northernmost point on the Moon, lying diametrically opposite the lunar south pole. It defines latitude 90° North. At the lunar north pole all directions point south; all lines of longitude converge there, so its longitude can be defined as any degree value.

Craters
Notable craters in the lunar north polar region (between 60° North latitude and the North pole) include: Avogadro, Bel'kovich, Brianchon, Emden, Gamow, Goldschmidt, Hermite, J. Herschel, Meton, Nansen, Pascal, Petermann, Philolaus, Plaskett, Pythagoras, Rozhdestvenskiy, Schwarzschild, Seares, Sommerfeld, Stebbins, Sylvester, Thales, Van't Hoff, W. Bond, and Whipple.

Exploration

The Astrobotic Technology Icebreaker mission was a mission concept planned for a 2015 mission, then delayed to 2016, and then cancelled. It was meant as a competition to win the 
Google Lunar X Prize.

See also
 Colonization of the Moon
 Lunar Reconnaissance Orbiter
 Selenography
 Lunar south pole

References

External links
 USGS: Earth's Moon
 Lunar Reconnaissance Orbiter Camera (LROC)
 LROC - Northern Polar Mosaic

North Pole